Gateway Indoor (also called Gateway Indoor Percussion, Gateway, and G-dub) was an indoor drumline based in St. Louis, MO. The group competes in the Percussion Independent World division of Winter Guard International, as well as the Mid-Continental Color Guard Association circuit.

Background
Gateway Indoor was started in 2004 by Paul Richardson and Mike Davis, and was named for the Gateway Arch in St. Louis. Since 2004, the group has been a Percussion Independent World class finalist 11 times, and has scored as high as 5th place.

Gateway Indoor is an independent percussion ensemble that competes in WGI and MCCGA Percussion Independent World circuits. Gateway also performs in locally organized events throughout the St. Louis area.

For a time, there existed two groups tied closely to Gateway that acted alongside the normal World Class group in other competitive classes. The Open class group was called Gateway Open and existed in 2007. Gateway Open competed in both MCCGA and WGI. The concept was reinvented in 2008 as Synergy Indoor, an A class group, and given independence from Gateway, although it retained its ties to the ensemble. Neither group has existed since the closure of the 2008 season.

Gateway was included in a group called 'Pearl/Adams Artists' and were Independent World Class Finalists and placed 7th.
The group is sponsored by Pearl Drums, Sabian, and Evans drum heads.

In 2018, after finishing in last place of the Percussion Independent World class at World Championships for the second year in a row, Gateway announced that they were moving to Percussion Independent Open class for the 2019 season.

The Crash
On March 25, 2012, Gateway encountered one of their worst tragedies. When they were traveling back to St. Louis after MCCGA Championships, Gateway's instrument truck veered off the road and rolled multiple times; scattering their equipment along the highway. No one was injured, but most of their equipment was damaged beyond repair. The Gateway directors called and informed the members. With the help of several other programs, Gateway was able to borrow a truck and enough equipment to finish the season and compete in WGI finals. Gateway ended up placing 7th, which is the second highest to date.

List of programs

See also 
Music of Missouri
Winter Guard International
Drum Corps International

References

External links 
 Gateway Indoor official website
 Winter Guard International
 Mid-Continental Color Guard Association
 
 
 
 
 

Percussion ensembles
Culture of St. Louis
Musical groups from St. Louis